Mateship with Birds  is a 2012 novel by Australian novelist Carrie Tiffany which won the inaugural 2013 Stella Prize.

Notes

 Dedication: For Peter

Reviews

 The Guardian
 The Monthly

Awards and nominations

 2013 inaugural winner Stella Prize 
 2013 winner New South Wales Premier's Literary Awards — Christina Stead Prize for Fiction 
 2013 longlisted International Awards — Women's Prize for Fiction (UK) 
 2013 shortlisted Miles Franklin Literary Award 
 2014 longlisted International Dublin Literary Award

References 

2012 Australian novels
Picador (imprint) books